Yury Mikhaylavich Khadaronak (Yuri Mikhaylovich Khodoronok; born 24 April 1965) is a former Belarusian football player.

Honours
Metallurg Molodechno
Belarusian SSR League champion: 1991
Soviet Amateur Cup winner: 1991

References

1965 births
Living people
Soviet footballers
FC Shakhtyor Soligorsk players
FC Neman Grodno players
FC Torpedo Minsk players
FC Vitebsk players
FC Molodechno players
Belarusian footballers
Belarusian expatriate footballers
Expatriate footballers in Poland
FC Luch Vladivostok players
Expatriate footballers in Russia
Russian Premier League players
FC Veras Nesvizh players
FC Yugra Nizhnevartovsk players
FC Dinamo Minsk players
Association football midfielders
Association football forwards